Natarajapuram  is a village in Tiruchirappalli taluk of Tiruchirappalli district in Tamil Nadu, India.

Demographics 

As per the 2001 census, Natarajapuram had a population of 1142 with 568 males and 574 females. The sex ratio was 1011 and the literacy rate, 83.48.

References 

 

Villages in Tiruchirappalli district